Lorenzo Maria Degeri (born 13 October 1992) is an Italian footballer.

Biography
Born in Crema, the Province of Cremona, Lombardy, Degeri started his career at Internazionale. He played for Giovanissimi Regionali B U13 team to Allievi B U16 team in 2007–08 season.

Cremonese
In mid-2008 Degeri returned to Cremona for Cremonese Allievi U17 team in temporary deal. The team was eliminated by Inter in the round of 16, which Inter was the losing finalists that season. Degeri's deal was renewed in 2009. He scored 17 goals in Campionato Berretti for Cremonese reserve. Degeri was promoted to the first team in 2010 after the club signed him in co-ownership deal for €500. Degeri was also eligible to the reserve of Cremonese until 2011. He collected 16 presences during the season 2012-2013 playing with Cremonese. He loaned to Pavia from September to January collecting 9 presences and a goal. In January 2014, he was loaned to Rimini.

In 2014, he was signed by Lucchese.

Pro Patria
On 14 September 2015 he was signed by Pro Patria.

International career
Degeri was selected to Italy Lega Pro representative teams for a Dubai youth tournament. The team won all 3 matches of the group stage. The team then eliminated RC Lens and beat Al-Shabab in the final. In June 2012 he received a call-up to Italy national under-20 football team against the representative team of Serie D. With Lega Pro representatives, he also played against Italy national under-19 football team. He also participated in 2013 Summer Universiade.

References

External links
 Football.it Profile 

1992 births
People from Crema, Lombardy
Living people
Italian footballers
Association football midfielders
Inter Milan players
U.S. Cremonese players
F.C. Pavia players
Rimini F.C. 1912 players
S.S.D. Lucchese 1905 players
Aurora Pro Patria 1919 players
Serie C players
Sportspeople from the Province of Cremona
Footballers from Lombardy